The Melville Shoe Corporation of Harrison, New York opened for business as a small shoe company in 1892 and was incorporated in 1916. From its inception through 1923 the company never had an unprofitable year, and paid dividends on preferred stock from 1916 to 1923.

Melville Corporation

In 1922 the company was reorganized as the Melville Corporation, which would grow into a major retail conglomerate. One of that firm's subsidiaries, the Meldisco Company, operated shoe departments in Kmart stores in the early 1980s.

References

External links
Replica Sneakers
Hotkicks Sneakers

Shoe brands
Shoe companies of the United States
Clothing companies established in 1892
American companies established in 1892
1892 establishments in New York (state)
American companies disestablished in 1922
1922 disestablishments in New York (state)
Defunct manufacturing companies based in New York (state)